Brian Thomas Gilmour (born 8 May 1987 in Irvine, North Ayrshire) is a Scottish footballer who plays as a midfielder.

He has represented his country from under-13 to under-21 levels playing in the European Under-19s final and represented Scotland under-20 at Fifa World Cup in Canada.

Playing career

Club
Gilmour began his career with Rangers. However, he did not make a first-team appearance for the club and on 9 February 2007 he signed for First Division side Clyde. He made his debut the following day in a 1–0 defeat to Livingston at the Broadwood Stadium. His first goal came on 17 March in a 2–2 draw with Ross County at Victoria Park. He made a total of 13 appearances, scoring one goal in 2006–07, his only season with the Bully Wee. He moved on to sign for fellow First Division side Queen of the South in July 2007, making his debut on 4 August in a 3–3 draw with St Johnstone at Palmerston Park. His first goal came on 19 April 2008 in a 1–0 home win over Dundee. He made a total of 27 appearances for Queens, before leaving in May 2008. 2007/08 was his only season with Queens with the majority of his appearances coming in the first half of the season. He was part of the squad that reached the 2008 Scottish Cup Final and qualified for the UEFA Cup for the following season.

Gilmour signed an 18-month contract with Finnish Veikkausliiga side FC Haka in the summer of 2008. Shortly after joining in August 2008 he played in Haka's 2008–09 UEFA Cup Second qualifying round defeat to Danish side Brøndby at their Brøndby Stadium. He mutually terminated his contract with FC Haka in May 2009. He played a total of seven league games for Haka. In September 2009 he had a trial with English Championship club Blackpool managed by Ian Holloway.

Gilmour signed for Football League Two side Lincoln City on 27 November 2009 until the end of the season. He struggled to get into the team at first initially but found himself getting regular games towards the end of the season, although he was played in an unfamiliar midfield position. Gilmour was offered a new deal but failed to agree personal terms with the club before then manager Chris Sutton's deadline. Gilmour's offer was withdrawn and he left the club in July 2010.

In July 2011 he joined Icelandic club KA who were playing in Iceland's second tier. After two years Gilmour left Iceland to join Ayr United on 12 November 2013, until January 2014. He made his debut the same day against Stranraer. Gilmour signed a new contract running until May 2018 with Ayr in January 2014. Gilmour was released by Ayr United on 31 January 2018.

International
Gilmour was the only Rangers player to participate in the 2006 European under-19 Championship for Scotland who reached the final. Gilmour made a subs appearance in the final losing 2–1 to Spain. He was selected in the Scotland squad for the 2007 Under-20 World Cup Finals in Canada in a group along with Japan, Nigeria and Costa Rica.

Coaching career
Gilmour returned to Rangers in May 2017 as a part-time coach in the clubs Academy. On 30 June 2020, as part of Rangers restructuring of its academy set-up, Gilmour was appointed joint coach of the B Team alongside Kevin Thomson.

Career statistics

Notes
a 1 Scottish Challenge Cup in 2007 (included in 2007–08 total)

References

External links

Stats Veikkausliiga
Brian Gilmourin sopimus Hakan kanssa purettu Veikkausliiga

Living people
1987 births
Scottish footballers
Scottish expatriate footballers
Footballers from East Ayrshire

Rangers F.C. players
People from Cumnock
Clyde F.C. players
Queen of the South F.C. players
FC Haka players
Lincoln City F.C. players
Association football midfielders
Scotland youth international footballers
Expatriate footballers in Finland
Expatriate footballers in Iceland
Knattspyrnufélag Akureyrar players
Ayr United F.C. players
Scottish Professional Football League players
Stenhousemuir F.C. players
English Football League players
Veikkausliiga players
1. deild karla players
Rangers F.C. non-playing staff
Scottish football managers
Lowland Football League managers
Association football coaches